The Arizona Complex League Cubs are a Rookie-level affiliate of the Chicago Cubs, competing in the Arizona Complex League of Minor League Baseball. The team plays it home games at Sloan Park in Mesa, Arizona. The team is composed mainly of players who are in their first year of professional baseball either as draftees or non-drafted free agents from the United States, Canada, Dominican Republic, Venezuela, and other countries.

History
The team first competed in the Arizona League (AZL) in 1997, and has been a member of the league continuously since then. During the 2018 and 2019 seasons, the team fielded two squads in the league, differentiated by suffixes (1 and 2, although some sources list them as Blue and Red). Prior to the 2021 season, the Arizona League was renamed as the Arizona Complex League (ACL).

Year-by-year record

Top player stats
Cubs Team and top Hitter and Pitcher statistics

Roster

References

External links
 Official website (Cubs Blue)
 Official website (Cubs Red)

Baseball teams established in 1997
Arizona Complex League teams
Cubs
Professional baseball teams in Arizona
Chicago Cubs minor league affiliates
1997 establishments in Arizona